Notoya is a traditional Japanese ryokan in Komatsu city, Ishikawa Prefecture in Japan. It was founded in 1311 near the Awazu Onsen and today offers hot spring baths and food.

See also 
List of oldest companies

References 

Hotels in Ishikawa Prefecture
Restaurants in Japan
Companies based in Ishikawa Prefecture
1310s establishments in Japan